Espriella is a surname. Notable people with the surname include:

Juancho De la Espriella (born 1973), Colombian musician, interpreter of vallenato on the accordion
Miguel de la Espriella (born 1947), self-taught painter and sculptor from Sucre, Colombia
Ricardo de la Espriella (born 1934), President of Panama from July 31, 1982, to February 13, 1984